Charles Maier may refer to:

 Charles Robertson Maier (born 1945), Priory Historian for St John Ambulance, The Priory of Canada
 Charles S. Maier (born 1939), professor of history at Harvard University

See also
Charles Mayer (disambiguation)
Charles Meyer (disambiguation)